Sébastien Chéré (born 23 December 1986) is a French professional footballer who plays as midfielder for Championnat National 2 club Épinal.

Previously, he played in Ligue 2 for Bourg-en-Bresse. Chéré was captain at Colmar prior to his transfer to Bourg-en-Bresse.

Career statistics

References

External links

Chéré LFP Profile

1986 births
Living people
Sportspeople from Épinal
Association football midfielders
French footballers
Ligue 2 players
Championnat National players
Championnat National 2 players
Championnat National 3 players
SAS Épinal players
SR Colmar players
Football Bourg-en-Bresse Péronnas 01 players
US Avranches players
Footballers from Grand Est